Acacia ingramii, commonly known as Ingram's wattle, is a shrub belonging to the genus Acacia and the subgenus Phyllodineae that is native to parts of north eastern Australia.

Description
It has smooth grey bark that is corrugated towards the base of the plant. The angled or terete branchlets have covered in appressed whitish hairs and have yellowish silky new shoots. Like most species of Acacia it has phyllodes rather than true leaves. The phyllodes have a prominent midvein and obscure lateral veins with an acute apex.

Taxonomy
The species was first formally described by the botanist Mary Tindale in 1978 as part of the work Notes on Australian taxa of Acacia as published in the journal Telopea. It was reclassified as Racosperma ingramii by Leslie Pedley in 2003 then returned to genus Acacia in 2006.
The specific epithet honours Cyril Keith Ingram who first recognised it as a new species.

Distribution
The shrub has a limited distribution in upper basin of the Macleay River in New South Wales to the east of Armidale. It is reasonably widespread in the escarpment gorges from around Apsley Falls to Wollomombi Falls and also in the Guy Fawkes River National Park usually in low woodland or open forest communities situated in steep country.

See also
List of Acacia species

References

ingramii
Flora of New South Wales
Plants described in 1978
Taxa named by Mary Tindale